Juan Manuel Molina Morote (born March 15, 1979, in Cieza, Murcia) is a male former race walker from Spain. He represented Spain at the Olympics in 2004 and 2008. His foremost achievement was a bronze medal in the 20 km walk event at the 2005 World Championships in Athletics. He competed at seven consecutive editions of the IAAF World Race Walking Cup, first appearing in 1999 and making his last outing in 2012.

He emerged in 2001 with a win at the 2001 European Athletics U23 Championships and second place at the 2001 Summer Universiade. He established himself on the senior circuit with a bronze medal at the 2002 European Athletics Championships. He was fifth at the 2004 Athens Olympics and won a series of medals in 2005, including silver medals at the European Race Walking Cup and Mediterranean Games and a gold medal at the Summer Universiade. His last major medal on the continental scene came at the Mediterranean Games, where he was the 20 km walk bronze medallist.

He retired from the sport, citing a long-term hamstring injury, after dropping out mid-race in the 50 km at the 2012 IAAF World Race Walking Cup.

Nowadays he is a sport professor of UCAM (University of Murcia)

Achievements

References

External links 
 
 
 

1979 births
Living people
People from Cieza, Murcia
Spanish male racewalkers
Athletes (track and field) at the 2004 Summer Olympics
Athletes (track and field) at the 2008 Summer Olympics
Olympic athletes of Spain
World Athletics Championships medalists
European Athletics Championships medalists
Universiade medalists in athletics (track and field)
Mediterranean Games silver medalists for Spain
Mediterranean Games bronze medalists for Spain
Mediterranean Games medalists in athletics
Athletes (track and field) at the 2005 Mediterranean Games
Athletes (track and field) at the 2009 Mediterranean Games
Universiade gold medalists for Spain
Universiade silver medalists for Spain
Medalists at the 2001 Summer Universiade
Medalists at the 2005 Summer Universiade
Sportspeople from the Region of Murcia